The Hansboro–Cartwright Border Crossing connects the towns of Hansboro, North Dakota and Cartwright, Manitoba on the Canada–United States border. It is connected by North Dakota Highway 4 in Towner County on the American side and Manitoba Highway 5 in Cartwright – Roblin Municipality on the Canadian side.

The Hansboro border station, which was built in 1963, was replaced in 2011.  The Canadian Customs port of Cartwright was established in 1914 in the town of Cartwright, and was relocated to the US border in the 1930s.  The current border station was built in 1982.

See also
 List of Canada–United States border crossings

References 

Canada–United States border crossings
1914 establishments in Manitoba
1914 establishments in North Dakota
Buildings and structures in Towner County, North Dakota